The 1800 Connecticut gubernatorial election took place on April 10, 1800. Incumbent Federalist Governor Jonathan Trumbull Jr. won re-election to a third full term, effectively unopposed.

Results

References 

Gubernatorial
Connecticut
1800